ICEF can mean

 International Federation of Chemical, Energy and General Workers' Unions, former global union federation
 ICEF (College), International College of Economics and Finance
 ICEF (Congress), International Congress on Engineering and Food